The 2003 New Zealand Warriors season was the 9th in the club's history. They competed in the National Rugby League's 2003 Telstra Premiership and finished the regular season in 6th place. The Warriors then came within one game of the grand final, losing to eventual premiers the Penrith Panthers. The coach of the team was Daniel Anderson while Monty Betham was the club captain.

Milestones
The Warriors had the youngest squad out of all the 15 clubs in the 2003 NRL season.
23 March — Round 2: Monty Betham played in his 50th match for the club.
6 April — Round 4: Francis Meli, Wairangi Koopu and Mark Tookey played in their 50th first grade games for the club.
22 June — Round 13: Motu Tony played in his 50th match for the club.
12 July — Round 18: Ali Lauitiiti played in his 100th match for the club.
10 August — Round 22: Richard Villasanti played in his 50th match for the club.
6 September — Round 26: Awen Guttenbiel played in his 100th match for the club.

Jersey & Sponsors

Fixtures

The Warriors used Ericsson Stadium as their home ground in 2003, their only home ground since they entered the competition in 1995.

Pre-season
The Warriors played a pre-season trial match against the Penrith Panthers in Invercargill on 28 February. 15,000 fans attended the match, which was sold out.

Regular season

Final Series

Ladder

Squad

Twenty eight players were used by the Warriors in 2003, including five players who made their first grade debuts.

Staff
Chief Executive Officer: Mick Watson

Coaching Staff
Head coach: Daniel Anderson
Assistant coach: Tony Kemp
Assistant coach: Rohan Smith

Transfers

Gains

Losses

Other Teams
Players not required by the Warriors were released to play in the 2003 Bartercard Cup. This included Motu Tony and Jerome Ropati at the Marist Richmond Brothers, Mark Robinson at the North Harbour Tigers and Richard Villasanti at the Canterbury Bulls.

Awards
Francis Meli won the Player of the Year award.

References

External links
Warriors official site
2003 Warriors Season at rugbyleagueproject.org

New Zealand Warriors seasons
New Zealand Warriors season
War